Nydri is a town and a community on the eastern coast of the island of Lefkada, Greece. It is part of the municipal unit Ellomenos. The community includes the small village Rachi. The Greek National Road 42 (Vasiliki - Lefkada (city) - Amfilochia) passes through the town. Nydri is a popular tourist town. In the sea in front of Nydri are several small islands including Madouri, Skorpios, Skorpidi and Sparti. The island Skorpios is the property of the Ribolovlev family.

The German archaeologist Wilhelm Dörpfeld, having examined the geographical descriptions of Homer in the Iliad and the Odyssey believed  that Lefkada was Homer's Ithaca, and that the palace of Odysseus was located west of Nydri on the south coast of Lefkada. He performed extensive excavations at Nydri and uncovered Mycenaean tombs, walls, ruins and artefacts which supported his hypothesis. Dörpfeld spent the last years of his life at Nydri and he is buried there.

Population

References

External links
 Photo of Nydri, early in the 20th century, by Wilhelm Dörpfeld. Digital library of Heidelberg University.

Populated places in Lefkada (regional unit)
Mediterranean port cities and towns in Greece